Centre of Attention or Center of Attention may refer to:

Art

Music

Albums
 Center of Attention, an album by hip-hop group InI, released as Lost & Found: Hip Hop Underground Soul Classics

Songs
 "Centre of Attention", Andy Lewis (producer)  Acid Jazz  UK	2011
 Center of Attention (Mayday Parade song) redirect to album